Fedashkuyeh Rural District is a rural district (dehestan) in Shibkaveh District, Fasa County, Fars Province, Iran. At the 2006 census, its population was 7,486, in 1,778 families.  The rural district has 6 villages.

References 

Rural Districts of Fars Province
Fasa County